Jonathan Cristian Figueira (born 10 April 1992) is an Argentine professional footballer who plays as a midfielder.

Career
Figueira's career began with Villa Dálmine; having signed from the Tigre academy. He made five appearances in each of his opening two seasons in Primera B Metropolitana, including for his professional debut on 22 February 2014 versus Estudiantes; his only past experience of senior football was as an unused substitute in a Copa Argentina fixture with Temperley in 2013. In the 2014 campaign, Villa Dálmine won promotion to Primera B Nacional; where he'd appear fifty-four times. He also scored four goals, with the last coming over Brown in June 2017. In early 2018, Figueira joined Primera C Metropolitana's Ferrocarril Midland.

On 16 July 2018, after eight games and one goal for Midland, Figueira sealed a return to Primera B Metropolitana with Atlanta. He made his opening appearances for them in September against Acassuso and Flandria. July 2019 saw Figueira unveiled as a new signing for Categoría Primera B side Deportes Quindío in Colombia. He appeared just three times in 2019; versus Bogotá, Cortuluá and Orsomarso. Figueira departed on 3 July 2020.

Career statistics
.

References

External links

1992 births
Living people
People from Tigre, Buenos Aires
Argentine footballers
Association football midfielders
Argentine expatriate footballers
Expatriate footballers in Colombia
Argentine expatriate sportspeople in Colombia
Primera B Metropolitana players
Primera Nacional players
Primera C Metropolitana players
Categoría Primera B players
Villa Dálmine footballers
Club Ferrocarril Midland players
Club Atlético Atlanta footballers
Deportes Quindío footballers
Sportspeople from Buenos Aires Province
21st-century Argentine people